KKAM (1340 AM) (branded as "Talk 103.9 and 1340") is a radio station broadcasting a news/talk/sports format. Licensed to Lubbock, Texas, United States. The station is currently owned by Townsquare Media.  Its studios are located in south Lubbock, and its transmitter is in Klapp Park southwest of downtown.

KKAM signed on in second-half of 1953 as a Class IV AM station with the call letters KDUB, co-owned with Lubbock television station KDUB 13 (present-day KLBK-TV). KFYO originally occupied the 1340 frequency in Lubbock, but moved to 790 AM in January 1953. Other call signs used in KKAM's history include KLBK, KMKM and KFMX.

KKAM became Lubbock's first all-sports radio station in November 1996, segueing from a News/Talk/Sports/Ag News format. The station was branded 'SportsRadio 1340 KKAM'. At the time of its format switch it was one of the first four All-Sports radio stations in Texas; joining 1310 The Ticket in Dallas, SportsRadio 610 KILT in Houston and Ticket 760 in San Antonio. Personalities that have worked at KKAM throughout its history include Ryan Hyatt, Mark Finkner, Jack Dale, Steve Dale, Don Williams (from the Lubbock Avalanche-Journal), Scott Fitzgerald (Texas Tech graduate, not the radio host who has worked for WBT/1110 and WERC-FM), Johnny May, Paul R. Beane, Bill Maddux, Jim Stewart and Misty.

KKAM became the flagship radio station for Texas Tech Football, Men's Basketball and Baseball in the 1994-95 athletic season, through Loyd Senn's All Sports Radio Network (ASRN).  The change ended the streak established by KFYO as the Texas Tech's flagship radio station, that was started with its first broadcast of Texas Tech Football in the 1940s. During KKAM's tenure as the Texas Tech flagship, football games were simulcast on KFMX and Men's Basketball games simulcast on 99.5 FM, the present-day KQBR. SportsRadio 1340 remained the flagship radio station for Texas Tech Football, Men's Basketball and Baseball through the 2008-09 athletic season.

On May 4, 2009 SportsRadio 1340 rebranded itself SportsRadio 1340 The Fan and added Dan Patrick, Jim Rome and Tony Bruno to the daily lineup. On May 28, 2009 SportsRadio 1340 The Fan changed network affiliations from ESPN to Sporting News Radio. At the end of December 2012 the Williams and Hyatt Show, hosted by Don Williams of the Lubbock A-J and Ryan Hyatt, left SportsRadio 1340 The Fan.  In February 2013, SportsRadio 1340 The Fan changed network affiliations again, switching from Yahoo! Sports Radio to CBS Sports Radio. The Dan Patrick Show and Jack Dale's Sportsline, hosted by Steve Dale, remained a part of the daily lineup.

In February 2017, SportsRadio 1340 The Fan added the Clay Travis and Colin Cowherd shows, from FOX Sports Radio, to the daily lineup.

On December 29, 2017 Steve Dale hosted the last edition of Sportsline on 1340 The Fan. He moved the show online to www.jackdalesportsline.com

On January 2, 2018 Weston Odom took over hosting duties of 1340 The Fan's local morning show, weekdays from 7am-9am. He is joined by producers Rob Breaux and Tucker Lowrance.

On October 15, 2018, The Rob Breaux Show w/ Rob Breaux and Karson Robinson became The Fan's local morning show, weekdays 7am-9am. Breaux is joined by producer Tucker Lowrance.

On October 22, 2018, 1340 The Fan announced a multi-year affiliation with the Kansas City Chiefs Radio Network, coinciding with the emergence of Texas Tech alum Patrick Mahomes as the team's star quarterback. Chiefs games would begin airing on 1340 The Fan for the remainder for the 2018 season.

On January 4, 2019, 1340 The Fan re-branded as 'Talk 1340- News. Money. Sports.' The station is no longer all-sports, with TSN News, ABC News and select News/Talk shows added to the lineup. The Rob Breaux Show with Karson Robinson moved time slots as a part of the format change to 9am-11am, weekdays. Also, Ryan Hyatt rejoined KKAM to host Raiderland Radio, weekdays 11am-12pm.

References

External links
KKAM-AM official website

KAM
Townsquare Media radio stations
News and talk radio stations in the United States
Sports radio stations in the United States